Eumemmerring is a suburb in Melbourne, Victoria, Australia, 32 km south-east of Melbourne's Central Business District, located within the City of Casey local government area. Eumemmerring recorded a population of 2,285 at the 2021 census.

The suburb of Eumemmerring is part of the City of Casey, which is currently the fastest growing council and city in Victoria.

Eumemmerring is a small hill, offering some well located homes a view of the Endeavour Hills landscape and part of the Dandenong Ranges.

Transport

Eumemmerring has many functional bus routes, connecting the suburb east to the Hallam railway station, to Westfield Fountain Gate and west to Dandenong railway station, to the Dandenong Central Business District and its main shopping centres the Armada Dandenong Plaza and Dandenong Market.

The closest train line near Eumemmerring is the Pakenham railway line which connects the South Eastern Suburbs of Melbourne to the Melbourne Central Business District.

Eumemmerring has these highways and freeways located nearby:
 South Gippsland Freeway
 Princess Highway
 Monash Freeway

Community facilities

The reserves located in Eumemmerring are:
 Waratah Reserve
 Kevin Adlard Reserve
 Mystic Court Reserve 
 Redfern Reserve
Doveton pool in the park is the nearest public swimming pool and is located in neighboring Doveton (Less than 2 km from Central Eumemmerring)

Doveton Soccer Club home ground is located at Waratah Reserve, Eumemmerring.

This suburb has all of the standard shops expected from Melbourne, i.e. Fish & Chips, Milk-bar and even a tattoo shop.

See also
 City of Berwick – Eumemmerring was previously within this former local government area.

References

Suburbs of Melbourne
Suburbs of the City of Casey